Gary Michael Heidnik (November 22, 1943 – July 6, 1999) was an American criminal who kidnapped, tortured, and raped six women (murdering two of them), while holding them captive in a self-dug pit in his basement floor, in Philadelphia, Pennsylvania. He was sentenced to death and executed by lethal injection in July 1999.

Heidnik was one of the inspirations for the Jame "Buffalo Bill" Gumb character in The Silence of the Lambs.

Early life
Gary Heidnik was born on November 22, 1943, in Eastlake, Ohio, a suburb of Cleveland, to Michael and Ellen Heidnik. He had a younger brother, Terry. After their parents divorced in 1946, the Heidnik children were raised by their mother for four years before being placed in the care of their father and his new wife. Heidnik would later claim he was emotionally abused by his father. He suffered a lifelong problem of bed wetting and said his father would humiliate him by forcing him to hang his stained sheets from his bedroom window, in full view of their neighbors. After his son's arrest, Heidnik's father denied the abuse allegations.

At school, Heidnik did not interact with his fellow students and refused to make eye contact. When a well-meaning, new female student asked, "Did you get the homework done, Gary?", he yelled at her, and told her she was not "worthy enough" to talk to him. Heidnik was also teased about his oddly shaped head, which he and Terry claimed was the result of a young Heidnik falling out of a tree. Nonetheless, Heidnik performed well academically and tested with an I.Q. of 148. With the encouragement of his father, 14-year-old Heidnik enrolled at the Staunton Military Academy in Staunton, Virginia, for two years, leaving before graduation. After another period in public high school, he dropped out and joined the United States Army when he was 17.

Heidnik served in the Army for thirteen months. During basic training, his drill sergeant graded him as "excellent." He applied for several specialist positions, including the military police, but was rejected. He was sent to San Antonio, Texas to be trained as a medic, and did well through medical training. However, he did not stay in San Antonio very long and was transferred to the 46th Army Surgical Hospital in Landstuhl, West Germany. Within weeks of his new posting in Germany, he earned his GED. In August 1962, Heidnik began complaining of severe headaches, dizziness, blurred vision, and nausea. A hospital neurologist diagnosed Heidnik with gastroenteritis and noted that he also displayed symptoms of mental illness, for which he was prescribed trifluoperazine. In October 1962, Heidnik was transferred to a military hospital in Philadelphia, Pennsylvania, where he was diagnosed with schizoid personality disorder and consequently honorably discharged from military service.

Adulthood
Shortly after his discharge, Heidnik became a licensed practical nurse and enrolled at the University of Pennsylvania, only to drop out after a single semester. He worked at a Veterans Administration hospital in Coatesville, but was fired for poor attendance and rude behavior towards patients. From August 1962 until his arrest in March 1987, Heidnik spent time in and out of psychiatric hospitals and had attempted suicide at least thirteen times. In 1970, his mother who had been diagnosed with bone cancer and was suffering the effects of alcoholism, committed suicide by drinking mercuric chloride. His brother Terry also spent time in mental institutions, and attempted suicide multiple times.

In October 1971, Heidnik incorporated a church called the "United Church of the Ministers of God", initially with a mere five followers. In 1975, he opened an account under the church's name with Merrill Lynch. The initial deposit was $1,500. Heidnik eventually amassed over $500,000 (over US$2.7 million in 2023). By 1986, the United Church of the Ministers of God was prosperous and opulent.

Heidnik used a matrimonial service to meet his future wife, Betty Disto, with whom he corresponded by mail for two years before proposing to her. Disto arrived from the Philippines in September 1985 and married Heidnik in Maryland the following month, on October 3. The marriage rapidly deteriorated after she caught him abed with a trio of other women. Throughout the course of their brief marriage, Heidnik forced his wife to be an onlooker while he performed intercourse with other women. Disto also accused Heidnik of repeatedly raping and assaulting her. With the help of the Filipino community in Philadelphia, she was able to leave Heidnik in January 1986. Unknown to Heidnik until his ex-wife requested child support payments in 1987, he had impregnated Disto during their short marriage. On September 15, 1986, she gave birth to a son, whom she named Jesse John Disto.

Heidnik also had a child with Gail Lincow, a son named Gary Jr. The child was placed in foster care soon after his birth. Heidnik had a third child with another woman, Anjeanette Davidson, who was illiterate and mentally disabled. Their daughter, Maxine Davidson, was born on March 16, 1978, and immediately placed in foster care. Shortly after Maxine's birth, Heidnik was arrested for the kidnapping and rape of Anjeanette's sister, Alberta, who had been living in an institution for the mentally disabled in Penn Township.

Criminal activities

1976: First legal charges
In 1976, Heidnik was charged with aggravated assault and carrying an unlicensed pistol after shooting at the tenant of a house he offered for rent, grazing the man's face.

1978: First imprisonment
In 1978, Heidnik signed out Alberta, the sister of his then-girlfriend Anjeanette Davidson, from the Penn Township mental institution on day leave and proceeded to imprison her in a locked storage room in his basement. After she was found and returned to the hospital, examination revealed that she had been raped and sodomized, and that she had contracted gonorrhea. Heidnik was arrested, charged and convicted of kidnapping, rape, unlawful restraint, false imprisonment, involuntary deviant sexual intercourse, and interfering with the custody of a committed person. The original sentence was overturned on appeal and Heidnik spent three years of his incarceration in mental institutions prior to being released in April 1983, under the supervision of a state-sanctioned mental health program.

1986: Spousal rape
After his wife Betty Disto left him in 1986, Heidnik was arrested again and charged with assault, indecent assault, spousal rape, and involuntary deviant sexual intercourse.

1986–1987: Serial rape and murder
On November 25, 1986, Heidnik abducted a woman named Josefina Rivera. By January 1987, he had kidnapped another four women, whom he held captive in a pit in the basement of his house at 3520 North Marshall Street in North Philadelphia. The captives were raped, beaten, and tortured.

One of the women, Sandra Lindsay, died of a combination of starvation, torture, and an untreated fever. Heidnik dismembered her body but had problems dealing with the arms and legs, so he put them in a freezer and labeled them "dog food." He cooked her ribs in an oven and boiled her head in a pot on the stove. Police officers came to his house after his neighbors complained that a nauseating odor was emanating from his residence, but they left the premises after Heidnik explained: "I'm cooking a roast. I fell asleep and it burnt."

Several sources state that Heidnik ground up the flesh of Lindsay, mixed it with dog food, and fed it to his other victims. His defense attorney, Chuck Peruto, said that upon examination of a Cuisinart and other tools in his kitchen, they found no evidence of this. Peruto said that Heidnik made up the story to support the insanity defense. Peruto said that Heidnik started the rumor of cannibalism in public, and that there was no evidence of anyone eating human flesh.

Heidnik used electric shock as a form of torture. At one point, he forced three of his captives, bound in chains, into a pit. Heidnik ordered Rivera and another woman to fill the hole with water, and then forced Rivera to help him apply electric current from a stripped extension cord to the women's chains. Deborah Dudley was electrocuted to death, and Heidnik disposed of her body in the Pine Barrens in New Jersey.

On January 18, 1987, Heidnik abducted Jacqueline Askins. The youngest of the six victims, Askins was only 18 years old at the time of her abduction. On May 5, 2018, a special report titled "Gary Heidnik's House of Horrors, 30 years later" was aired, and featured an interview in which Askins recounted that Heidnik wrapped duct tape around the mouths of the victims, and stabbed them in their ears with a screwdriver.

On March 23, 1987, Heidnik and Rivera abducted Agnes Adams. The next day, Rivera convinced Heidnik to let her go, temporarily, so she could visit her family. He drove her to a gas station and said that he would wait for her there. She walked to her boyfriend's house; she initially wanted to confront Heidnik, but then decided to call the police instead. The responding officers, noting chafing from chains on her leg, went to the gas station and detained Heidnik. His purported best friend, Cyril ("Tony") Brown, was also arrested. Brown was released on $50,000 bail and an agreement that he would testify against Heidnik. In part, Brown admitted that he had witnessed Lindsay's death in the basement and he also admitted that he had witnessed Heidnik's dismemberment of her body. Shortly after his arrest in April 1987, Heidnik attempted to hang himself in his jail cell.

Trial and appeals
At Heidnik's arraignment, he claimed that the women were already in the house when he moved in. At trial, Heidnik was defended by A. Charles Peruto, Jr., who attempted to prove that Heidnik was legally insane. Heidnik's insanity claim was successfully rebutted by the prosecution led by Charles F. Gallagher, III. The fact that he successfully amassed approximately $550,000 through his brokerage account was used to prove that he was an astute investor, and therefore not insane. Testimony which was given by his Merrill Lynch financial advisor, Robert Kirkpatrick, was also used to prove Heidnik's mental competence. Kirkpatrick called Heidnik "an astute investor who knew exactly what he was doing." On July 1, 1988, Heidnik was convicted of two counts of first degree murder, six counts of kidnapping, five counts of rape, four counts of aggravated assault and two counts of involuntary deviate sexual intercourse. He was sentenced to death and incarcerated at the State Correctional Institution at Pittsburgh. In January 1989, he attempted suicide with an overdose of prescribed thorazine.

In 1997, Heidnik's daughter, Maxine Davidson White, and his ex-wife, Betty Heidnik, filed a suit in federal court in the Eastern District of Pennsylvania, in which they requested a stay of execution on the basis that Heidnik was not competent enough to be executed. After two years of legal proceedings in various courts, on July 3, 1999, the U.S. District Court for the Eastern District of Pennsylvania issued its final ruling, clearing the way for Heidnik's execution.

Death
Heidnik's last meal was two slices of cheese pizza and black coffee. He was executed by lethal injection on July 6, 1999, at the State Correctional Institution – Rockview, in Bellefonte, Pennsylvania and his body was cremated. As of 2022, he was the last person to have been executed by the Commonwealth of Pennsylvania. He remains the third of only three people who have been executed in Pennsylvania since the resumption of the death penalty. The other two were Keith Zettlemoyer in May 1995 and Leon Moser in August 1995.

List of victims
 Josefina Rivera — age 25, kidnapped on November 25, 1986
 Sandra Lindsay — age 24, kidnapped on December 3, 1986; murdered on February 7, 1987
 Lisa Thomas — age 19, kidnapped on December 23, 1986
 Deborah Dudley — age 23, kidnapped on January 2, 1987; murdered on March 19, 1987
 Jacqueline Askins — age 18, kidnapped on January 18, 1987
 Agnes Adams — age 24, kidnapped on March 23, 1987

In popular culture
Heidnik was one of six real-life murderers upon whom author Thomas Harris based Jame "Buffalo Bill" Gumb, the villain of his 1988 novel The Silence of the Lambs.

In 2018, the band SKYND released a song which was based on the events, featuring Jonathan Davis from Korn.

See also
 Capital punishment in Pennsylvania
 Capital punishment in the United States
 List of most recent executions by jurisdiction
 List of people executed in Pennsylvania
 List of white defendants executed for killing a black victim
 Race and capital punishment in the United States

References

Further reading
Davidson, Peter. (2006) Death by Cannibal: Criminals with an Appetite for Murder. Berkley. 

1943 births
1999 deaths
20th-century executions by Pennsylvania
20th-century executions of American people
American nurses
American people executed for murder
American people convicted of rape
American people of Czech descent
Criminals from Philadelphia
Executed people from Ohio
Military personnel from Ohio
People convicted of murder by Pennsylvania
People executed by Pennsylvania by lethal injection
People from Lake County, Ohio
People with schizoid personality disorder
Staunton Military Academy alumni
Torture in the United States
United States Army soldiers